The Palm Beach Zoo & Conservation Society is a non-profit zoological organization located at Dreher Park in West Palm Beach. The zoo houses hundreds of animals, many of them endangered, within 23-acres of lush tropical habitat. The Palm Beach Zoo & Conservation Society is a member of the Association of Zoos and Aquariums and the World Association of Zoos and Aquariums.

The mission of the Zoological Society of the Palm Beaches, Inc. (Palm Beach Zoo & Conservation Society) is "to inspire people to act on behalf of wildlife and the natural world."

History 

In 1951, the city of West Palm Beach paid the state of Florida $100 for Bacon Park. Bacon Park was formerly used for a landfill and a tent city campground, which was destroyed in the 1928 hurricane. Bacon Park was renamed Dreher Park in 1957 after Parks Superintendent Paul Dreher. As part of its transformation, Dreher built a red barn in Dreher Park. Using his own money, Dreher bought one goat, two ducks, one goose, and two chickens for the petting zoo. The zoo became known as the Dreher Park Zoo.

On February 29, 1964, a locally famous animal known as Joey, the kangaroo, became a resident of the zoo. Joey was a pet that was infamous for escaping from his home and wandering around the city. Joey was featured in two issues of Life Magazine in October 1961 and April 1964 and was declared an honorary member of the Boy Scouts of America. A frequent visitor to Joey's home was President Kennedy's daughter Caroline Kennedy. Joey was later the victim of a ban that did not allow for him to stay as a house pet and was moved to the Dreher Park Zoo.

In the early 1960s, a petting zoo is known as "Jett's Petting Zoo" visited South Florida, bringing with a young Asian elephant. Residents of South Florida campaigned for the purchase of the young elephant, now named Toppie, for the zoo. The West Palm Beach Firemen's Benevolent Association helped raise 1,000 books of Top Value Trading Stamps for the purchase, after which the elephant was named. On April 16, 1965, Toppie, the four-year-old, 2,000-pound elephant, arrived at the zoo where she would live until her later transfer to Lion Country Safari in 1975.

On May 19, 1965, a squirrel monkey was born at the zoo, becoming the first animal birth at the Dreher Park Zoo. On the same day, the second birth of the zoo occurred: a white-fronted capuchin monkey. On March 27, 1969, with the support of the city, The Zoological Society of the Palm Beaches was founded. On October 1, the operation of the zoo was transferred over to the Zoological Society. Under the management of the Zoological Society, the zoo was transformed. By 1971, the older enclosures in the zoo had been replaced, and several pathways had been paved.

In 1969, Hammer, the black bear, arrived at the zoo. Hammer was one of the bears used in the television show, Gentle Ben. In 1973, Princess the Bengal tiger came to the zoo, becoming the zoo's first big cat. In 1978, Zelda and Henrietta, the pygmy hippos, arrived. These hippos remained at the zoo until 1982. In 1981, the zoo built the first outdoor exhibit for Goeldi's monkeys to ever exist. In 1987, Townee, the Bengal tiger, arrived at the zoo. The Florida Fish and Wildlife Commission confiscated Townee after being illegally held as a pet in Miami. Townee died in 2007, living to be one of the oldest tigers in the United States. In March 1989, the Association of Zoos and Aquariums accredited the Dreher Park Zoo. On March 17, 1995, Colin, the Florida panther, was born. Colin remained a resident of the zoo for 17 years.

In 1997, the Dreher Park Zoo changed its name to the Palm Beach Zoo. A donation by George and Harriett Cornell allowed the zoo to plan a $30 million redevelopment of the park. On March 19, 2000, Tiger Falls opened to the public. The zoo has since had three tiger cubs born in 2011. In 2001, the zoo opened the Florida Pioneer Trail, a re-creation of a cypress swamp habitat. In 2003, the zoo's Interactive Fountain and Orientation Plaza opened. In 2004, the zoo opened the 18-million dollar "George and Harriett Cornell Tropics of the Americas," a three-acre exhibit complex. The Palm Beach Zoo opened "Wallaby Station" and "Koala Forest" in 2010, which highlight wildlife from Australia.

The Melvin J. and Claire Levine, Animal Care Complex, opened on April 22, 2009. The 10,000 square foot facility is a five-million-dollar animal hospital and is America's first LEED-certified zoo animal hospital. In 2014, the Palm Beach Zoo changed its name to the Palm Beach Zoo and Conservation Society. 

In 2018, Margo McKnight became the new director and CEO of the Palm Beach Zoo with plans to improve the security of the zoo for the sake of the safety of both animals and workers, after some controversial and fatal incidents in previous years.

Exhibits and Animals

Florida Wetlands
The Florida Wetlands showcases a recreation of a cypress swamp and showcases the following:

 American alligator
 American black bear
 American flamingo
 Bald eagle
 Barn owl
 Barred owl
 Black swan
 Florida panther
 Gopher tortoise
 Nene
 North American river otter
 Redhead
 Ruddy duck
 Turkey vulture
 Wood duck

Asia
The Henry and Charlotte Kimelman Tiger Falls opened in 2000. 

On November 8, 2006, Malayan tigers "Mata" and "Rimba" arrived at the zoo from the San Diego Zoo. Malayan tiger "Berapi" came to the zoo in November 2010. Three cubs sired by Rimba were born to Berapi on May 12, 2011. The three tigers "Jaya", "Bunga" and "Penari" were moved to the Jacksonville Zoo on October 28, 2013.

In March 2015, the zoo opened its "Tiger River" habitat, adding an extra exhibit yard to the Henry and Charlotte Kimelman Tiger Habitat. Here, visitors will find:

 Aldabra giant tortoise
 Black howler monkey
 Llama
 Malayan tiger
 Red-crowned crane
 Rhinoceros hornbill
 Southern ground hornbill
 White-tailed deer

Harriet W. and George D. Cornell Tropics of the Americas 
This 18 million-dollar exhibit complex opened in 2004 and features animals and the Mayan culture found in Central and South America. The exhibit is located on a three-acre peninsula in the zoo. Animal Planet featured Tropics of the Americas on the television show "Ultimate Zoo" in 2006. On January 15, 2018, the zoo opened their new ocelot habitat, which was sponsored by a local Palm Beach couple, Carole and John Moran. The new habitat allows for three ocelots to live and roam around. This couple also sponsored the Panther Prowl habitat. The exhibit features two Mayan pyramids that are over 40 feet tall, and a walk-through cave, among other displays and houses animals found in Central and South America such as:

 Axolotl
 Baird's tapir
 Blue-and-yellow macaw
 Broad-snouted caiman
 Capybara
 Chilean flamingo
 Colombian white-faced capuchin
 Common squirrel monkey
 Crested porcupine
 Jaguar
 Giant anteater
 Mexican spider monkey
 Military macaw
 Mute swan
 Ocelot
 Patagonian mara
 Spotted whistling duck
 Tufted capuchin

The Islands 
This section of the zoo showcases different species of animals from islands all over the world including:

 Goeldi's monkey
 Golden lion tamarin
 Hoffmann's two-toed sloth
 Koala
 Red ruffed lemur
 Ring-tailed lemur
 Scarlet macaw
 Serval
 Rainbow lorikeet
 Siamang
 Tawny frogmouth

Other amenities 
 Interactive Play Fountain
 Wildlife Carousel
 Latitude 26 cafe
 Amazon Marketplace & Jungle Traders Gift Shop
 35+ Keeper Talks & Encounters Per Week
 Bronze Sculpture of "Water Dogs" by Artist Geoffrey C Smith Located near the River Otter Exhibit

Conservation 

The Palm Beach Zoo Conservation Society takes part in various conservation programs, including studies, campaigns, projects, and awareness campaigns. The Palm Beach Zoo has partnered with institutions and organizations such as the Southeastern Disease Cooperative at the University of Georgia, the Brookfield Zoo, the Association of Zoos and Aquariums (AZA) Contraception Center, the Florida Wildlife Commission (FWC), the Brevard Zoo, the Santa Fe Teaching Zoo, The US Fish and Wildlife Service, the Florida State Parks Service, the Palm Beach County Marine Mammal Stranding Network, and Madidi National Park. The Palm Beach Zoo is also the first zoo to partner with the Florida Wildlife Corridor.

Melvin J. & Claire Levine Animal Care Complex 
The Palm Beach Zoo is home to the Melvin J. & Claire Levine Animal Care Complex, which serves as the headquarters for the Palm Beach Zoo Conservation Society.  The complex has earned Gold Certification for Leadership in Energy and Environmental Design (LEED) by the Green Building Council. The Melvin J. and Claire Levine Animal Care Complex. It also houses the Center for Conservation Medicine.

Education 
The Palm Beach Zoo Education Department is an organization hosting multiple programs to children from ages 3 to 18 to educate and spread awareness to children and adolescents about conservation efforts and their significance. The department provides entertainment to members as well as hands-on experiences with the zoo's attractions as well as the opportunity to partake in active conservation projects. Programs include the Zoo Camp, Overnight Adventures, the Ed Morse ZooMobile, and other opportunities for schools, scout troops, and community groups looking for involvement in the zoo's conservation projects.

International projects 
In collaboration with Madidi National Park in Bolivia and the Wildlife Conservation Society (WCS), the Palm Beach Zoo provides funding and staff for conservation activities in a protected area of approximately 18,900 kilometers squared. The area protects jaguars, black faced spider monkeys, lowland tapir, giant river otters, Andean bears, Andean condors and other wildlife abound in this remote sector of the Amazon. New Species are still being discovered to this day. The region is also home to eleven indigenous groups that are also contributing to the preservation of the area and its wildlife.

The Palm Beach Zoo also supports the Wildlife Conservation Society in its projects to strengthen anti-poaching laws in Malaysia in order to protect tigers and their habitats. These species are considered critically endangered. The Palm Beach zoo also provides education and activities about these tigers in areas local to their habitats. The Palm Beach Zoo provides information on their site on how others can contribute to tiger conservation in Malaysia.

Hours 

Last Admission at 4:15 pm.

Closed on Thanksgiving and Christmas Days.

Incidents and controversies

Worker killed by tiger 
On April 15, 2016, lead zookeeper Stacey Konwiser was mauled by a rare Malayan tiger while preparing the animal for a show called "Tiger Talk." Konwiser, who had been working for the Palm Beach Zoo for three years, had been doing routine work alone in the tiger enclosure when the animal attacked. To reach Konwiser, staff needed to tranquilize the tiger, as it had been guarding her body like prey. Konwiser was then brought to St. Mary's Medical Center, where she was later pronounced dead. Zoo officials later stated that Konwiser had been covering for another staff member who had called in sick. It was also reported that zookeepers were not supposed to enter the enclosure without another keeper present. The zoo went against killing the tiger after the incident and instead tranquilized the animal at the scene, a move that was criticized by animal rights activist Russ Rector.

Shotguns stolen from critical response team 
In April 2018, 2 modified shotguns belonging to the zoo's "critical response team" were removed from a safe. It was reported that someone had broken in and stolen the guns overnight.  Head of Communications & Public Relations for Palm Beach Zoo, Naki Carter, had no comment when asked whether this was an "inside job" or not.  Despite a reward offering for the return of the weapons, the guns have not been found to this day.

Flood kills two bush dogs 
In October 2017, two bush dogs were killed after a zookeeper forgot to turn off the water that fills the pool in their habitat. The two animals, Lilly and Carino, were presumed dead after the entire zoo was searched, and were not found.  It is said that Lily and Carino were likely burrowed underground, where they sleep, at the time of the accident. Head of Communications & Public Relations for Palm Beach Zoo, Naki Carter, stated that the zoo has now made modifications to the habitat, including an overflow drain and new security features to the waterline.

References

External links

Zoos in Florida
Buildings and structures in West Palm Beach, Florida
Tourist attractions in Palm Beach County, Florida
Education in Palm Beach County, Florida